Richard Evelyn Byrd Sr. (August 13, 1860 – October 23, 1925) was a Virginia lawyer, politician and newspaperman.

Early and family life

He was the first son born to Jennie (Rivers) and her husband William Byrd, who had become an adjutant general of the state of Texas, and born in Austin, Travis County, Texas months after the American Civil War had begun. After the war, his parents returned to Virginia, and lived with his grandparents. His grandfather and namesake, also Richard E. Byrd (1801-1872), was a politician and by then former slaveholder (the elder Richard E. Byrd owned 26 enslaved people in Frederick County in 1860, and possibly more in neighboring Clarke County). The elder Byrd had been one of the representatives of Frederick, Hampshire, and Morgan Counties in the Virginia Constitutional Convention of 1851 and had also served in the Virginia General Assembly. His great grandfather was Thomas Taylor Byrd, who used enslaved labor to work plantations, mostly in what became Clarke County after it was split from Frederick County. His great-great grandfather William Byrd had served in the British army during the American Revolutionary War, then moved to northwestern Virginia. This Richard E. Byrd graduated from the University of Virginia and later received a law degree from the University of Maryland.

This Richard E. Byrd married Eleanor Bolling Flood, also descended from the First Families of Virginia, in Martinsburg, West Virginia on September 15, 1886. They would have sons Harry Flood Byrd (1887–1966); Richard Evelyn Byrd (1888–1957) and Thomas Bolling Byrd (1890–1968).

Career

Byrd moved to Winchester Virginia from West Virginia in 1887 and became a wealthy apple grower in the Shenandoah Valley and published the Winchester Star newspaper.  He represented Winchester in the Virginia House of Delegates, and served as that body's Speaker from 1908 until 1914. He was the United States Attorney for the Western District of Virginia from 1914 until 1920.

Legacy

One of his sons, Richard, became famous as a naval aviator who led an expedition to the South Pole; another, Harry, would serve as Governor of Virginia and in the United States Senate.

References

External links
 
 
 Richard Evelyn Byrd Sr. at The Political Graveyard

Speakers of the Virginia House of Delegates
Democratic Party members of the Virginia House of Delegates
Politicians from Winchester, Virginia
Richard Evelyn Byrd I
1860 births
1925 deaths
Politicians from Austin, Texas
United States Attorneys for the Western District of Virginia
University of Virginia alumni
University of Maryland Francis King Carey School of Law alumni
20th-century American politicians